The Song Is June! is a 1958 album by June Christy recorded with Pete Rugolo's Orchestra. It was reissued in 1997 as a double CD with Off-Beat.

Track listing
 "Spring Can Really Hang You Up the Most" (Tommy Wolf, Fran Landesman) – 4:13
 "The One I Love (Belongs to Somebody Else)" (Isham Jones, Gus Kahn) – 2:00
 "Nobody's Heart" (Richard Rodgers, Lorenz Hart) – 4:07
 "My Shining Hour" (Harold Arlen, Johnny Mercer) – 1:47
 "I Remember You" (Victor Schertzinger, Johnny Mercer) – 2:55
 "Night Time Was My Mother" (Connie Pearce, Arnold Miller) – 2:55
 "I Wished on the Moon" (Ralph Rainger, Dorothy Parker) – 2:18
 "The Song Is You" (Jerome Kern, Oscar Hammerstein II) – 4:20
 "As Long as I Live" (Harold Arlen, Ted Koehler) – 2:00
 "Saturday's Children" (André Previn, Bob Russell) – 2:56

Personnel
Tracks 3, 6, and 10
 June Christy – vocals
 Bud Shank – alto saxophone
 Bob Cooper – tenor saxophone
 Marty Berman – baritone saxophone
 Vincent DeRosa – flugelhorn
 Red Mitchell bass
 Larry Bunker – vibraphone
 Tony Rizzi – guitar
 Shelly Manne – drums
 Dan Lube – violin
 Lou Raderman – violin
 David Frisina – violin
 Victor Arno – violin
 Erno Neufeld – violin
 Alfred Lustgarten – violin
 Lou Klass – violin
 Samuel Freed – violin
 Benny Gill – violin
 Virginia Majewski – viola
 Stanley Harris – viola
 Alex Neiman – viola
 Ed Lustgarten – cello
 Raphael Kramer – cello
 Kurt Reher – cello
 Kathryn Julye – harp
 Pete Rugolo – arranger, conductor

Tracks 2, 4, 7 and 9
 June Christy – vocals
 Pete Candoli – trumpet
 Buddy Childers – trumpet
 Ed Leddy – trumpet
 Al Porcino – trumpet
 Milt Bernhart – trombone
 Frank Rosolino- trombone
 Herb Harper- trombone
 George Roberts- bass trombone
 Vincent DeRosa – flugelhorn
 Jack Cave – flugelhorn
 Bud Shank – alto saxophone
 Paul Horn – alto saxophone, flute
 Bob Cooper – tenor saxophone
 Ronny Lang – tenor saxophone
 Chuck Gentry – baritone saxophone
 Russ Freeman- piano
 Howard Roberts – guitar
 Sam Rice – bass
 Red Mitchell bass
 Shelly Manne – drums
 Larry Bunker – vibraphone
 Pete Rugolo – arranger, conductor

Tracks 1, 5 and 8
 June Christy – vocals
 Vincent DeRosa – flugelhorn
 Jack Cave – flugelhorn
 Paul Horn – alto saxophone
 Bob Cooper – tenor saxophone
 Marty Berman – baritone saxophone
 Tony Rizzi -guitar
 Red Mitchell – bass
 Frank Flynn – drums
 Larry Bunker – vibraphone
 Kathryn Julye – harp
 Dan Lube – violin
 Lou Raderman – violin
 Erno Neufeld – violin
 Victor Lustgarten – violin
 Virginia Majewski – viola
 Alex Nieman – viola
 Stanley Harris – viola
 Ed Lustgarten – cello
 Ralph Kramer – cello
 Kurt Reher – cello
 Pete Rugolo – arranger, conductor

References

June Christy albums
1958 albums
Albums arranged by Pete Rugolo
Albums conducted by Pete Rugolo
Capitol Records albums

Albums recorded at Capitol Studios